In enzymology, a phosphatidylcholine---sterol O-acyltransferase is an enzyme that catalyzes the chemical reaction

phosphatidylcholine + a sterol  1-acylglycerophosphocholine + a sterol ester

Thus, the two substrates of this enzyme are phosphatidylcholine and sterol, whereas its two products are 1-acylglycerophosphocholine and sterol ester.

This enzyme belongs to the family of transferases, specifically those acyltransferases transferring groups other than aminoacyl groups.  The systematic name of this enzyme class is phosphatidylcholine:sterol O-acyltransferase. Other names in common use include lecithin---cholesterol acyltransferase, phospholipid---cholesterol acyltransferase, LCAT (lecithin-cholesterol acyltransferase), lecithin:cholesterol acyltransferase, and lysolecithin acyltransferase.  This enzyme participates in glycerophospholipid metabolism.

References

 
 
 
 

EC 2.3.1
Enzymes of unknown structure

it:Fosfatidilcolina-sterolo O-aciltransferasi